Thomas Richard Purnell (November 11, 1847 – December 19, 1908) was a United States district judge of the United States District Court for the Eastern District of North Carolina.

Education and career

Born in Wilmington, North Carolina, Purnell graduated from Trinity College (now Duke University) in 1869 and read law to enter the bar that same year. He was in private practice in Baltimore, Maryland and Salem, North Carolina from 1870 to 1873. He was a librarian for the State of North Carolina in Raleigh from 1873 to 1876, thereafter resuming his private practice in Raleigh until 1897. He served the North Carolina House of Representatives from 1876 to 1877. He was a Commissioner for the United States Circuit Courts for the Fourth Circuit from 1877 to 1891. He was a member of the North Carolina Senate from 1883 to 1884. He was an unsuccessful candidate for Attorney General of North Carolina in 1892.

Federal judicial service

On April 26, 1897, Purnell was nominated by President William McKinley to a seat on the United States District Court for the Eastern District of North Carolina vacated by Judge Augustus Sherrill Seymour. Purnell was confirmed by the United States Senate on May 5, 1897, and received his commission the same day. Purnell served in that capacity until his death on December 19, 1908, in Raleigh.

References

Sources
 

1847 births
1908 deaths
Judges of the United States District Court for the Eastern District of North Carolina
United States federal judges appointed by William McKinley
United States federal judges admitted to the practice of law by reading law
People from Wilmington, North Carolina
People from Raleigh, North Carolina